Jaime Alejandro Bravo Jeffery (born 4 April 1982), or simply Jaime Bravo, is a retired Chilean football goalkeeper.

International career
Jaime Bravo played for Chile national football team in the U–17 and U–20 categories.

Honours

Club
Unión Española
 Primera División de Chile (1): 2005 Apertura

External links
 BDFA profile
 Jaime Bravo at Football Lineups

1982 births
Living people
Chilean footballers
Ñublense footballers
Curicó Unido footballers
Deportes Iberia footballers
Audax Italiano footballers
Coquimbo Unido footballers
Unión Española footballers
Santiago Morning footballers
Unión San Felipe footballers
Association football goalkeepers